The 1984 FIBA Africa Championship for Women was the 9th FIBA Africa Championship for Women, played under the rules of FIBA, the world governing body for basketball, and the FIBA Africa thereof. The tournament was hosted by Senegal from December 22 to 30, 1984.

Senegal defeated Zaire 2–0 in a walkover win.

Draw

Preliminary round

Group A

Group B

Knockout stage

Semifinals

7th place match

5th place match

Bronze medal match

Final

Final standings

Awards

External links
Official Website

References

1984
Bask
1984 in women's basketball
1984 in African basketball
International women's basketball competitions hosted by Senegal